Zaven Der Yeghiayan (Զաւէն Տէր Եղիայեան; 8 September 1868 in Mosul, Ottoman Iraq – 4 June 1947 in Baghdad, Iraq) was Armenian Patriarch of Constantinople in 1913–22.  He was deported to Mosul during the Armenian genocide.

Life 
Zaven Der-Yeghiayan received his primary education in Baghdad and continued his studies at the Armash Theological Seminary. He became bishop and then prelate for Diyarbakir and in 1913 he became patriarch of Constantinople. The Ottoman government exiled him to Baghdad in 1916. In 1926, Zaven became director plenipotentiary of the Melkonian Institute in Cyprus. In 1927, he moved back to Baghdad. He is the author of My Patriarchal Memoirs. This memoir gives readers a detailed eyewitness account of the Armenian genocide and attempts by the Patriarch himself to stop it.

See also
Witnesses and testimonies of the Armenian genocide

References 

Armenian Patriarchs of Constantinople
Armenian Oriental Orthodox Christians
1868 births
1947 deaths
People from Mosul
Iraqi people of Armenian descent
Armenians from the Ottoman Empire
Armenian genocide survivors
Witnesses of the Armenian genocide
20th-century Oriental Orthodox bishops